K-Minus Initiative is the title of the first album by nerdcore (or "geeksta rap") band Commodore 64. It was released in 1999 (see 1999 in music). As their first (and their only) full-length nerdcore/geeksta rap record to be commercially released (so far), and it had sold over 130,000 copies in its first three months of release. Their sound and beats have been linked to that of the early Beastie Boys.

Track listing 
"Pep Assembly" – 1:55
"K-Minus" – 2:34
"Sissy MCs" – 2:42
"Health Maintenance Organization" – 4:52
"Proof of the Riemann Mapping Theorem" – 0:39
"Horton Hears a Ho (featuring Saqi4Neeq)" – 3:57
"Animal Crackers" – 2:20
"Even Do Music!" – 0:32
"It's Time for Food (Rhymes)" – 3:50
"Fruit Salad" – 3:06
"Dutch" – 1:55
"Putney Swipe (featuring Prozac)" – 3:27
"Straight Outta CompUSA" – 2:19
"Foam" – 2:44
"Poop Assembly" – 0:53

Personnel
 Smart Money "Bass-I.Q.": vocals, rapping
 Teddy Ruxpin aka "HMO": vocals, rapping
 The Professa MC Squared: vocals, rapping
 DJ Goodbeats  - Apple Macintosh: computer, electronic vocals, rapping

References

External links
K-Minus Initiative at Facebook

1999 albums